Arthur Hydes (24 November 1911 – 1990) was an English football player born in Barnsley. He played for Leeds United and Newport County. He scored almost 100 goals in his career with over 80 of them at Leeds. This included three consecutive years as Leeds' leading scorer.

References
Profile at leeds-fans.org.uk

1911 births
1990 deaths
English footballers
Leeds United F.C. players
Newport County A.F.C. players
Association football forwards